Akayu may refer to:
Akayu, Yamagata, a town located in Higashiokitama District, Yamagata Prefecture, Japan
24965 Akayu, an asteroid
Akayu Station